The Topaz Vibe is a British sailing dinghy designed by Ian Howlett and Rob White. Built by Topper International, it was first introduced in 2006. There are two models, the Vibe and the Vibe X, with the latter carrying larger sails. The Vibe is a World Sailing Learn to Sail class.

Design
The Vibe is a small recreational dinghy, with the hull built predominantly of trilam polyethylene. It has a fractional sloop rig, a raked stem, an open reverse transom, a transom-hung rudder controlled by a tiller and a retractable daggerboard keel. It displaces .

The Vibe has a beamy and chined hull and was designed as a performance hiking dinghy, though can be fitted with a single trapeze.

Variants
Vibe
Vibe X
Model with larger sail area and larger gennaker.

See also
List of sailing boat types

References

External links

 Topper International - Vibe

Dinghies
Sailboat types built by Topper International